The Ulkayak is a river in Kazakhstan.

It is one of the rivers of the southern part of the Turgay Depression, belonging to the Irgyz -Turgay ecoregion. It flows across the Zhangeldi District of the Kostanay Region, Kazakhstan. There are historical Kazakh sites in the valley of the Ulkayak.

Course 
The Ulkayak is formed at the confluence of rivers Zhantai (Жантай) and Tolybai (Толыбай). The river flows first southwestwards across steppe territory within a flat valley. Towards its last stretch its valley widens and the river meanders heading roughly southwards. Finally it flows into the Kyzylkol, a salt lake which is connected with the Turgay through a system of lakes linked by channels. The water of the river is fresh, but it turns brackish in the summer, when the river dries in stretches and its flow almost stops.

Tributaries
The river freezes yearly between early November and late March. Its main food is snow.

See also
List of rivers of Kazakhstan
Lakes of the lower Turgay and Irgiz

References

External links
Экспедиция на Улькаяк - YouTube
Fishing in the Ulkayak river

Rivers of Kazakhstan
Kostanay Region
Shalkarteniz basin